The Handley Page Hinaidi was one of two twin-engine bombers built by Handley Page that served with the Royal Air Force between 1925 and 1935. The aircraft was developed from the Handley Page Hyderabad and named after Hinaidi, an RAF station in Iraq.

Design and development
In 1923, Handley Page designed and built a new heavy bomber based on its W.8 airliner, the Hyderabad. The Hyderabad was an all-wooden biplane powered by two Napier Lion engines. Forty-five were built, entering service from 1925.

The Hinaidi was an improved version of the Hyderabad built to meet Air Ministry Specification 13/29. The first machine, the HP33 Hinaidi I -in fact an early production Hyderabad, J7745, with another engine and a change of fin and rudder- first flew on 26 March 1927. At least four Hyderabads were converted to Hinaidi Is, while six late-production Hyderabads were completed as Hinaidi Is, retaining the wooden airframe of the Hyderabads. The first true Hinaidi, the HP36 Hinaidi II, went into production after major structural modifications were implemented, the structure being changed from wooden to metal.

A re-engined version with two 480 hp Siddeley Jaguars was proposed, the HP44 Hinaidi III, but not built.

Operational history
The first 33 aircraft came into service in 1929, and were issued to No. 99, No. 10 and No. 503 squadrons. Total production ended with 36 aircraft, with some being converted to transport aircraft on the North-West Frontier in India. The Clive II transport version operated out of Lahore.

Variants
HP.33 Hinaidi I
 Wooden airframe. Three built, one prototype, J7745, as a conversion of a Hyderabad, two from new, with seven Hyderabads converted.
HP.33 Clive I
 One of the Hinaidi I prototypes, J9126, built using a W.10 fuselage as a transport design later converted to become Clive III though not entering service as such. Later as G-ABYX sold to Sir Alan Cobham with his air circus and named "Youth of Australia" and later renamed "Astra".
HP.35 Clive II
 Two transport aircraft built, all-metal structure, J9948 and J9949.
HP.36 Hinaidi II
 All-metal airframe. 34 built, prototype J9478 and production K1063-K1078 and K1909-K1925. Approximately 20+ aircraft were converted into Clive II transport aircraft configuration in the early 1930s.

Operators

 Royal Air Force
 No. 10 Squadron RAF
 No. 99 Squadron RAF
 No. 502 Squadron RAF
 No. 503 Squadron RAF
 Heavy Transport Flight RAF – Handley Page Clive

Specifications (Hinaidi Mk II)

See also

References

Notes

Bibliography

 Barnes, C. H. Handley Page Aircraft Since 1907. London: Putnam & Company, Ltd., 1987. .
 Clayton, Donald C. Handley Page, an Aircraft Album. Shepperton, Surrey, UK: Ian Allan Ltd., 1969. .
 Jarrett, Philip. "By Day and By Night: Hyderabads and Hinadis". Aeroplane Monthly, August 1993, Vol 21 No 8, Issue No 244. London: IPC. ISSN 0143-7240. pp. 18–24.
 Mason, Francis K. The British Bomber Since 1914. London: Putnam Aeronautical Books, 1994. .
 Thetford, Owen. Aircraft of the Royal Air Force 1918–57, 1st edition. London: Putnam, 1957.
 Thetford, Owen. "By Day and By Night: Hyderabads and Hinadis". Aeroplane Monthly, September 1993, Vol 21 No 9, Issue No 245. London: IPC. ISSN 0143-7240. pp. 18–24

External links

 Handley Page aircraft
 Handley Page Hinaildi – British Aircraft Directory
 Flight article of 1930 showing Clive transport

1920s British bomber aircraft
Hinaidi
Aircraft first flown in 1927
Biplanes